Haplos (International title: Angela / ) is a Philippine television drama supernatural series broadcast by GMA Network. Directed by Gil Tejada Jr., it stars Sanya Lopez, Thea Tolentino, Pancho Magno and Rocco Nacino. It premiered on July 10, 2017 on the network's Afternoon Prime line up replacing D' Originals. The series concluded on February 23, 2018 with a total of 164 episodes. It was replaced by Hindi Ko Kayang Iwan Ka in its timeslot.

The series is streaming online on YouTube.

Premise
Angela has an ability to heal others through her caress which she doesn't know yet. While her half-sister, Lucille has an ability in witchcraft. Angela's quiet life will be in trouble with the arrival of Lucille. Lucille will take everything away from Angela believing its for her.

Cast and characters

Lead cast
 Sanya Lopez as Angela Marie "Anj / Angela Marie" L. Alonzo-Cortez / Elang / Exotica / Alice
 Thea Tolentino as Lucille Bermudez / Rosella “Sella”
 Pancho Magno as Benedict “Benny” Dizon / Eduardo Gomez
 Rocco Nacino as Gerald Cortez / John “Janjan” Montecines

Supporting cast
 Emilio Garcia as Renato Alonzo
 Patricia Javier as Minda Luciano-Alonzo
 Francine Prieto as Mercedes "Cedes" Bermudez
 Diva Montelaba as Gwendolyn "Wendy" Reyes
 Kim Rodriguez as Olga Maglalim
 Mega Unciano as Mega
 Nikki Co as Jake
 Celia Rodriguez as Bettina "Biring" Alonzo
 Maria Isabel Lopez as Corazon "Cora" Maglalim
 Lito Legaspi as Eduardo "Lolo Doods" Dizon

Guest cast
 Ar Angel Aviles as young Angela
 Geson Granado as young Gerald
 Liezel Lopez as young Mercedes
 Jillian Ward as teen Angela
 Maey Bautista as Fely
 Betong Sumaya as Raul
 Lotlot de Leon as Stella Montecines
 Raquel Monteza as Adele "Del" Alonzo
 Mosang as Mrs. Solis
 Marnie Lapuz as Atty. Gomez
 Pat Fernandez as Lita
 Priscilla Meirelles as Sally
 Mike Lloren as Fred Cortez
 Banjo Romero as Obet
 Ces Aldaba as a manager 
 Mara Alberto as Nadia "Marikit"
 Paolo Gumabao as a doctor
 Paolo Paraiso as a soldier
 Jun Hidalgo as a hunter
 Gee Canlas as Irene
 Marlann Flores as Kara
 Mia Pangyarihan as Verna
 Cheche Tolentino as Didi 
 Jholan Veluz as Cea
 Cynthia Yapchingco as Riri 
 Maureen Larrazabal as Sol Españo
 Koreen Medina as a bar dancer
 Princess Guevarra as a massage therapist
 Catherine Rem as Diamond
 Louise Bolton as Lena
 Aira Bermudez as Nessa
 Hannah Precillas as Imee 
 Ayeesha Cervantes as Leila
 Philip Lazaro as Sirena
 Ashley Cabrera as Ariana Alonzo Cortez

Ratings
According to AGB Nielsen Philippines Nationwide Urban Television Audience Measurement People in television homes, the pilot episode of Haplos earned a 4.9% rating. While the final episode scored a 6.6% rating. The series had its highest rating on September 12, 2017 with an 8.1% rating.

References

External links
 
 

2017 Philippine television series debuts
2018 Philippine television series endings
Fantaserye and telefantasya
Filipino-language television shows
GMA Network drama series
Philippine supernatural television series
Television shows set in the Philippines
Witchcraft in television